Syd Ackland was an Australian rules footballer who played in the South Australian National Football League ('SANFL') for the Norwood Football Club from 1922 to 1931.

References

Norwood Football Club players
Australian rules footballers from South Australia